SMEC may refer to:

SMEC Holdings, an Australian firm that provides consulting services on major infrastructure projects
Saint Margaret Engineering College, in Neemrana, Alwar, Rajasthan, India
St. Martin's Engineering College, in the Dhuallpally area of Andhra Pradesh state, India
 An annual competition held by the Sir Syed University of Engineering and Technology computer department